The 2023 NCAA Division I men’s basketball tournament is an ongoing 68-team single-elimination tournament to determine the National Collegiate Athletic Association (NCAA) Division I men's college basketball national champion for the 2022–23 season. The 84th annual edition of the tournament began on March 14, 2023, and will conclude with the championship game on April 3 at NRG Stadium in Houston, Texas.

ASUN champion Kennesaw State made its NCAA tournament debut, while Southern Conference champion Furman made its first NCAA appearance since 1980.

With 20 losses, Texas Southern is tied for the most losses ever by a team to make the tournament. The Coppin State Eagles and Liberty Flames also made the tournament with 20 losses in 2008 and 2013, respectively.

For only the second time in history, a 16-seed defeated a 1-seed, when Fairleigh Dickinson upset Purdue 63–58 in Columbus.

For the third consecutive year, and seventh time since 2012, a 15-seed defeated a 2-seed in the tournament. This time, 15-seed Princeton upset 2-seed Arizona 59–55 in Sacramento (their first tournament win since 1998). Arizona became the first team to lose to a 15-seed team twice, with the first loss being against the Santa Clara Broncos in 1993. For the third consecutive year as well, a 15-seed reached the Sweet 16 as Princeton subsequently defeated Missouri in the second round. Missouri subsequently became the second team to lose to a No. 15 seed twice, albeit on different seed lines, as the Tigers were a No. 7 losing to Princeton and a No. 2 when they fell to Norfolk State in 2012.
Additionally, Virginia was knocked out as a top-four seed for the third time in five years, and second straight time as a 4-seed when they were upset by 13-seed Furman.

The defending national champions Kansas Jayhawks were eliminated in the second round, against the Arkansas Razorbacks. It was the sixth straight tournament where the defending champion failed to make the Sweet Sixteen.

Procedures

A total of 68 teams are taking part in the tournament with 32 automatic bids being filled by each program that won its conference tournament. The remaining 36 bids were issued "at-large", with selections extended by the NCAA Selection Committee on Selection Sunday, March 12. The Selection Committee also seeded the entire field from 1 to 68.

Eight teams (the four-lowest seeded automatic qualifiers and the four lowest-seeded at-large teams) will play in the First Four. The winners of these games will advance to the main tournament bracket.

Schedule and venues         
The following are the sites selected to host the each round of the 2023 tournament:

First Four
March 14 and 15
University of Dayton Arena, Dayton, Ohio (Host: University of Dayton)

First and second rounds (subregionals)
March 16 and 18
Amway Center, Orlando, Florida (Host: University of Central Florida)
Legacy Arena, Birmingham, Alabama (Host: Southeastern Conference)
Wells Fargo Arena, Des Moines, Iowa (Host: Drake University) 
Golden 1 Center, Sacramento, California (Host: California State University, Sacramento)
March 17 and 19
MVP Arena, Albany, New York (Hosts: Siena College, Metro Atlantic Athletic Conference)
Greensboro Coliseum, Greensboro, North Carolina (Host: Atlantic Coast Conference)
Nationwide Arena, Columbus, Ohio (Host: Ohio State University)
Ball Arena, Denver, Colorado (Host: Mountain West Conference)

Regional semi-finals and finals
March 23 and 25
East regional
Madison Square Garden, New York, New York (Hosts: Big East Conference, St. John's University) 
West regional
T-Mobile Arena, Las Vegas, Nevada (Host: University of Nevada, Las Vegas)
March 24 and 26
South regional
KFC Yum! Center, Louisville, Kentucky (Host: University of Louisville)
Midwest regional
T-Mobile Center, Kansas City, Missouri (Host: Big 12 Conference)

National semi-finals and championship
April 1 and 3
NRG Stadium, Houston, Texas (Hosts: University of Houston, Rice University, Houston Christian University, Texas Southern University)

Qualification and selection of teams

Automatic qualifiers

Seeds

The tournament seeds and regions were determined through the NCAA basketball tournament selection process and were published by the selection committee after the brackets were released.

*See First Four

Bracket
All times are listed in Eastern Daylight Time (UTC−4)
* denotes overtime period</onlyinclude>

First Four – Dayton, OH
The First Four games involve eight teams: the four lowest-seeded automatic qualifiers and the four lowest-seeded at-large teams.

South regional – KFC Yum! Center, Louisville, KY

South regional final

South regional all-tournament team

East regional – Madison Square Garden, New York, NY

East regional final

East regional all-tournament team

Midwest regional – T-Mobile Center, Kansas City, MO

Midwest regional final

Midwest regional all-tournament team

West regional – T-Mobile Arena, Las Vegas, NV 
 
{{16TeamBracket | nowrap = yes
 
| RD1=First roundRound of 64March 16–17
| RD2=Second roundRound of 32March 18–19
| RD3=Regional semifinalsSweet 16March 23
| RD4=Regional FinalElite 8March 25
 
| subgroup1= Des Moines – Thu/Sat
| subgroup2= Albany – Fri/Sun
| subgroup3= Denver – Fri/Sun
| subgroup4= Sacramento – Thu/Sat
 
| RD1-seed01=1
| RD1-team01= Kansas
| RD1-score01=96
| RD1-seed02=16
| RD1-team02= Howard
| RD1-score02=68
 
| RD1-seed03=8
| RD1-team03= Arkansas
| RD1-score03=73
| RD1-seed04=9
| RD1-team04= Illinois
| RD1-score04=63
 
| RD1-seed05=5
| RD1-team05= Saint Mary's
| RD1-score05=63
| RD1-seed06=12
| RD1-team06= VCU
| RD1-score06=51
 
| RD1-seed07=4
| RD1-team07= UConn
| RD1-score07=87
| RD1-seed08=13
| RD1-team08= Iona
| RD1-score08=63
 
| RD1-seed09=6
| RD1-team09= TCU
| RD1-score09=72
| RD1-seed10=11
| RD1-team10= Arizona State
| RD1-score10=70
 
| RD1-seed11=3
| RD1-team11= Gonzaga
| RD1-score11=82
| RD1-seed12=14
| RD1-team12= Grand Canyon
| RD1-score12=70
 
| RD1-seed13=7
| RD1-team13= Northwestern
| RD1-score13=75
| RD1-seed14=10
| RD1-team14= Boise State
| RD1-score14=67
 
| RD1-seed15=2
| RD1-team15= UCLA
| RD1-score15=86
| RD1-seed16=15
| RD1-team16= UNC Asheville
| RD1-score16=53
 
| RD2-seed01=1
| RD2-team01=Kansas
| RD2-score01=71
| RD2-seed02=8
| RD2-team02= Arkansas
| RD2-score02=72
 
| RD2-seed03=5
| RD2-team03=Saint Mary's
| RD2-score03=55
| RD2-seed04=4
| RD2-team04=UConn
| RD2-score04=70 
| RD2-seed05=6
| RD2-team05=TCU
| RD2-score05=81
| RD2-seed06=3
| RD2-team06= Gonzaga| RD2-score06= 84 
| RD2-seed07=7
| RD2-team07=Northwestern
| RD2-score07=63
| RD2-seed08=2
| RD2-team08=UCLA| RD2-score08=68 
| RD3-seed01=8
| RD3-team01=Arkansas
| RD3-score01=7:15 p.m.
| RD3-seed02=4
| RD3-team02=UConn
| RD3-score02=CBS
 
| RD3-seed03=3
| RD3-team03=Gonzaga
| RD3-score03=9:45 p.m.
| RD3-seed04=2
| RD3-team04=UCLA
| RD3-score04=CBS
 
| RD4-seed01=
| RD4-team01=
| RD4-score01=
| RD4-seed02=
| RD4-team02=
| RD4-score02=TBS
}}
 
West regional final

 
West regional all-tournament team

Final Four – Houston, Texas

 
National semifinals

National championship

Final Four all-tournament team

Notes and game summaries
 
Upsets
Per the NCAA, an upset occurs "when the losing team in an NCAA tournament game was seeded at least two seed lines better than the winning team." The 2023 tournament has nine upsets so far, with five in the first round and four in the second round.

Record by conference

The FF, R64, R32, S16, E8, F4, CG, and NC columns indicate how many teams from each conference were in the first four, round of 64 (first round), round of 32 (second round), Sweet 16, Elite Eight, Final Four, championship game, and national champion, respectively.

Media coverage

Television

CBS Sports and Warner Bros. Discovery Sports have US television rights to the tournament. As part of a cycle that began in 2016, CBS will televise the 2023 Final Four and the national championship game.

The 2023 tournament will be Jim Nantz's final season as the lead play-by-play announcer, with Ian Eagle succeeding him starting in 2024.

Television channels
Selection Show – CBS
First Four – TruTV
First and Second Rounds – CBS, TBS, TNT and TruTV  
Regional semifinals and finals – CBS and TBS
National semifinals (Final Four) and championship – CBS

Studio hosts
 Greg Gumbel (New York City and Houston) – First round, second round, Regionals, Final Four, and National Championship Game 
 Ernie Johnson (Atlanta and Houston) – First round, second round, Regional Semifinals, Final Four, and National Championship Game
 Adam Lefkoe (Atlanta) – First Four and first round
 Adam Zucker (New York City) – First round and second round (game breaks)
 Nabil Karim (Atlanta) – First round and second round (game breaks)

Studio analysts
 Charles Barkley (New York City and Houston) – First round, second round, Regionals, Final Four, and National Championship Game
 Seth Davis (Atlanta and Houston) – First Four, first round, second round, Regional Semifinals, Final Four, and National Championship Game
 Clark Kellogg (New York City and Houston) – First round, second round, Regionals, Final Four, and National Championship Game
 Candace Parker (Atlanta) – First Four, first round, second round, Regional Semifinals
 Kenny Smith (New York City and Houston) – First round, second round, Regionals, Final Four, and National Championship Game
 Gene Steratore (New York City and Houston) (Rules Analyst) – First Four, first round, second round, Regionals, Final Four and National Championship Game
 Wally Szczerbiak (New York City) – Second round
 Jay Wright (Atlanta and Houston) – First Four, first round, second round, Regional Semifinals, Final Four, and National Championship Game

Commentary teams
 Jim Nantz/Bill Raftery/Grant Hill/Tracy Wolfson – First and Second Rounds at Birmingham, Alabama; Midwest Regional at Kansas City, Missouri; Final Four and National Championship at Houston, Texas
 Brian Anderson/Jim Jackson/Allie LaForce – First and Second Rounds at Des Moines, Iowa; East Regional at New York City, New York
 Ian Eagle/Jim Spanarkel/Evan Washburn – First and Second Rounds at Greensboro, North Carolina; South Regional at Louisville, Kentucky
 Kevin Harlan/Dan Bonner/Stan Van Gundy/Lauren Shehadi – First and Second Rounds at Orlando, Florida; West Regional at Las Vegas, Nevada
 Brad Nessler/Brendan Haywood/Dana Jacobson – First and Second Rounds at Sacramento, California
 Spero Dedes/Debbie Antonelli/AJ Ross – First and Second Rounds at Albany, New York
 Andrew Catalon/Steve Lappas/Jamie Erdahl – First and Second Rounds at Columbus, Ohio
 Lisa Byington/Steve Smith/Avery Johnson/Andy Katz – First and Second Rounds at Denver, Colorado
 Tom McCarthy/Avery Johnson/Jon Rothstein – First Four at Dayton, Ohio

Radio
Westwood One will have exclusive coverage of the entire tournament.

First Four
Ted Emrich and Jon Crispin – at Dayton, Ohio

First and second rounds
John Sadak and Will Perdue – Orlando, Florida
Brandon Gaudin and Stephen Bardo – Birmingham, Alabama
Jason Benetti and Robbie Hummel – Des Moines, Iowa
Ryan Radtke and Dan Dickau – Sacramento, California
Scott Graham and P. J. Carlesimo – Albany, New York
Bill Rosinski and Austin Croshere – Greensboro, North Carolina
Kevin Kugler and Jordan Cornette – Columbus, Ohio
Dave Pasch and Fran Fraschilla – Denver, Colorado

Regionals
Gary Cohen and Jon Crispin – East Regional at New York City, New York
Ryan Radtke and P. J. Carlesimo – Midwest Regional at Kansas City, Missouri
Tom McCarthy and Jordan Cornette – South Regional at Louisville, Kentucky
Kevin Kugler and Robbie Hummel – West Regional at Las Vegas, Nevada

Final Four and national championship
Kevin Kugler, Jim Jackson, Clark Kellogg, and Andy Katz – Houston, Texas

Internet
Video

Live video of games is available for streaming through the following means:

 NCAA March Madness Live (website and app, CBS games not avaliable on digital media players; access to games requires TV Everywhere authentication through provider)
 Paramount+ (only CBS games)
 Watch TBS website and app (only TBS games, required TV Everywhere authentication)
 Watch TNT website and app (only TNT games, required TV Everywhere authentication)
 Watch truTV website and app (only truTV games, required TV Everywhere authentication)
 Websites and apps of cable, satellite, and OTT providers of CBS, TBS, TNT, and truTV (access required subscription)

For the app this year, a new multiview which showed all games airing simultaneously was available.

In addition, the March Madness app offered Fast Break''', whiparound coverage of games similar to NFL RedZone.
 Dave Briggs, Tony Delk, Tyler Hansbrough, Randolph Childress – Atlanta

Audio

Live audio of games is available for streaming through the following means:
 NCAA March Madness Live (website and app)
 Westwood One Sports website
 TuneIn (website and app, required TuneIn Premium subscription) 
 Varsity Sports app
 Websites and apps of Westwood One Sports affiliates
New in 2023, the March Madness app supported Apple CarPlay and Android Auto through a native app.

See also
 2023 NCAA Division I women's basketball tournament
 2023 NCAA Division II men's basketball tournament
 2023 NCAA Division III men's basketball tournament
 2023 National Invitation Tournament

Notes

References

NCAA Division I men's basketball tournament
Tournament
College basketball tournaments in Texas
Basketball competitions in Houston
NCAA Division I men's basketball tournament
NCAA Division I men's basketball tournament
NCAA Division I men's basketball tournament
NCAA